Frank Thomas Mace III (born November 11, 1998) is an American professional baseball pitcher in the Cleveland Guardians organization. He played college baseball for the Florida Gators.

Amateur career
Mace attended Sunlake High School in Land o' Lakes, Florida. As a junior in 2016, he pitched to a 1.14 ERA with 64 strikeouts over 49 innings. In 2017, his senior year, he went 8–2 with a 1.29 ERA and ninety strikeouts. He was named the North Suncoast Pitcher of the Year by the Tampa Bay Times. He was selected by the Cincinnati Reds in the 12th round of the 2017 Major League Baseball draft, but did not sign and instead enrolled at the University of Florida.

In 2018, Mace's freshman year at Florida, he appeared in 26 games (making six starts) in which he went 5–0 with a 4.16 ERA over  innings. He played in the Cape Cod Baseball League that summer with the Yarmouth–Dennis Red Sox. As a sophomore in 2019, he made a team-high 16 starts, going 8–5 with a 5.32 ERA. That summer, he attended the USA Baseball Collegiate National Team Training Camp in Cary, North Carolina, but was not named to the 26-man roster. As a junior, he pitched to a 1.67 ERA over 27 innings before the college baseball season was cancelled due to the COVID-19 pandemic. He was considered a top prospect and was expected to be selected in the 2020 Major League Baseball draft, but was not drafted due to signability concerns, and thus returned to Florida to play in 2021. In 2021, Mace appeared in 16 games (15 starts) in which he pitched to a 6-2 record and a 4.38 ERA over  innings.

Professional career
Mace was selected by the Cleveland Indians in the second round with the 69th overall selection of the 2021 Major League Baseball draft. He signed for $1.1 million. He was assigned to the Lake County Captains of the High-A Midwest League for the 2022 season. In mid-May, he was placed on the injured list with a calf injury, and was activated in early June. Over 22 games (21 starts), Mace went 1-5 with a 4.55 ERA, 75 strikeouts, and 38 walks over 85 innings.

References

External links

Florida Gators bio

1998 births
Living people
Baseball players from Florida
Baseball pitchers
Florida Gators baseball players
Yarmouth–Dennis Red Sox players
Lake County Captains players